The Workers' Gymnasium (official name) is an indoor arena located west of the Workers' Stadium in Beijing, China. It was inaugurated in 1961 for the 26th World Table Tennis Championships.

It hosted the boxing events at the 2008 Summer Olympics and the Judo events at the 2008 Summer Paralympics. It is one of 11 Beijing-based venues to be renovated and upgraded for the Olympics. The arena has a seating capacity of 13,000.

Notable events
 10 April 1985:  Wham!, the first Western band to perform in China.
 19 February 1995: Roxette - Crash! Boom! Bang! Tour
 4 December 1998: Ricky Martin - Vuelve World Tour
 31 March 2004: Deep Purple
 7 March 2005: Norah Jones - Norah Jones & The Handsome Band Tour
 1 November 2008: Kanye West - Glow in the Dark Tour
 1 December 2008: Kylie Minogue - KylieX2008
 6 April 2011: Bob Dylan - Never Ending Tour 2011
 4 November 2013: OneRepublic - Native Tour
 9 November 2013: T-ara 2013 Showcase Live in Beijing 
 10 July 2014: Jessie J
 10 January 2015: WINNER WWIC 2015
 30 October 2015: Vitas - 15 Years With You - China Tour 2015
 16 April 2016: Road FC 30
 14 August 2016: Scorpions (band) - Get Your Sting and Blackout World Tour
 2 September 2017: Black Panther (band) - Hei Bao 30 Years Anniversary Concert

See also
List of indoor arenas in China

References

External links

Beijing2008.cn profile.

Venues of the 2008 Summer Olympics
Sports venues in Beijing
Indoor arenas in China
Olympic boxing venues
Boxing venues in China
Venues of the 1990 Asian Games
Sports venues completed in 1961
1961 establishments in China